Paul de Jersey,  (born 21 September 1948) is an Australian jurist who served as the 26th governor of Queensland, in office from 29 July 2014 to 1 November 2021. He was Chief Justice of Queensland from 1998 to 2014.

Education
De Jersey was educated at Anglican Church Grammar School (1961–1965) and the University of Queensland. He graduated with a Bachelor of Arts and a Bachelor of Laws with Honours in 1971. He was part of the Queensland University Regiment from 1966 to 1971 and was commissioned in 1969.

Career
De Jersey practiced law in Queensland and was called to the Queensland Bar in 1971. He took silk in 1981 as a Queen's Counsel.

At the bar, De Jersey practiced in the commercial field; appeared in constitutional cases before the High Court of Australia, and also appeared before the Judicial Committee of the Privy Council. He was appointed a judge of the Supreme Court of Queensland in 1985 and was the commercial causes judge between 1986 and 1989. He was the judge constituting the Mental Health Tribunal between 1994 and 1996, the president of the Queensland Industrial Court between 1996 and 1997, and the chairman of the Law Reform Commission of Queensland from 1996 to 1997.

De Jersey was appointed Chief Justice of Queensland on 17 February 1998. He has been the chancellor of the Anglican Diocese of Brisbane since 1991. He was also the vice president of the Australian Cancer Society between 1995 and 1998 and its president between 1998 and 2001, a trustee of the National Breast Cancer Foundation between 1994 and 1999, and the chairman of the Queensland Cancer Fund (now The Cancer Council Queensland) between 1994 and 2001.

Governor of Queensland
De Jersey became the 26th Governor of Queensland on 29 July 2014. On the retirement of Alex Chernov as Governor of Victoria on 1 July 2015, de Jersey became the longest-serving sitting governor of an Australian state and by custom assumed the additional office of Administrator of the Commonwealth who exercises the powers of the Governor-General of Australia in the governor-general's absence or disability.

In November 2018, it was announced that de Jersey's original term had been extended by two years through to 29 July 2021. In June 2021, it was announced that he would stay on until November to allow Jeannette Young, his successor, to focus on the COVID-19 vaccine rollout as Chief Health Officer, before taking up the role of governor.

Personal life
De Jersey married Kaye Brown in 1971. Together they have three children and three grandchildren.

Titles, styles, and honours

De Jersey's style and title as governor in full is: His Excellency The Honourable Paul de Jersey, Companion of the Order of Australia, Commander of the Royal Victorian Order, Knight of Grace of the Order of St John, Queen's Counsel, Governor of the State of Queensland in the Commonwealth of Australia.

 As Administrator: ''His Excellency The Honourable Paul de Jersey, Companion of the Order of Australia, Commander of the Royal Victorian Order, Knight of Grace of the Order of St John, Queen's Counsel, Administrator of the Commonwealth of Australia.

Life Member of the Bar Association of Queensland

Honorary degrees
  2000: Honorary Doctorate of the University of Queensland.
  2008: Honorary Doctorate of the University of Southern Queensland.
  2014: Honorary Doctorate of the Griffith University.

Honorary appointments
  Australian Army 28 July 2014-1 November 2021: Regimental Colonel of the Royal Queensland Regiment.
  Order of St John 28 July 2014-1 November 2021: Deputy Prior of the Order of St John.
  Scouts Australia 28 July 2014-1 November 2021: Chief Scout of Scouts Australia QLD
  17 December 2014-1 November 2021: Honorary Air Commodore of No. 23 Squadron RAAF

References

1948 births
Living people
Governors of Queensland
Chief Justices of Queensland
Companions of the Order of Australia
Australian King's Counsel
University of Queensland alumni
People educated at Anglican Church Grammar School
Recipients of the Centenary Medal
Honorary air commodores of the Royal Australian Air Force
Judges of the Supreme Court of Queensland
20th-century Australian judges
21st-century Australian judges
Commanders of the Royal Victorian Order